The Ottilienberg is a mountain near Eppingen in Baden-Württemberg, Germany. The mountain has been a cult place in ancient times. On top of the mountain are the remains of a late medieval pilgrimage church and remains of a fortification from the 17th century.

The mountain itself is a sandstone oval about 3 km south east of Eppingen. Because of the extraordinary geological formation, the 310 m high mountain is assumed to be a very early refuge and cult place. The pilgrimage church was donated in 1473. South of the chapel was a graveyard. 1697 the mountain top was dismantled to an artillery fortress. While the fortress decayed through the following decades, the church and some surrounding economy buildings did remain, until they were severely damaged during World War II in April 1945. The chapel was reconstructed in simplified shape in 1954/55.

Mountains and hills of Baden-Württemberg